Paterdecolyus is a subgenus of "king crickets" in the genus Anabropsis: found in India and Tibet.

Species
See Anabropsis.

References

Ensifera genera
Anostostomatidae
Orthoptera of Asia
Insect subgenera